Spurius Nautius Rutilus (  493488 BC) was a Roman Republican aristocrat of the Patrician gens Nautia, who lived during the early 5th century BC. He served as Consul of Rome in 488 BC, with Sextus Furius as his colleague.

Family 
Spurius was the probably the elder brother of Gaius Nautius Rutilus, consul in 475 and in 458 BC, but the younger Nautius may have been his son.

Biography 
Dionysius of Halicarnassus first mentions Spurius Nautius in 493 BC as having been one of the most distinguished young Patricians during the period of the first secession of the plebs. He was consul in 488 BC which was also the same year that the Volsci, under the command of Coriolanus, marched on Rome and besieged the city.

References

Bibliography 
 

5th-century BC Roman consuls
Rutilus, Spurius